Nesticodes is a monotypic genus of comb-footed spiders containing only the red house spider [Nesticodes rufipes (Lucas, 1846)]. It was first described by Allan Frost Archer in 1950, and has a pantropical distribution due to ship and air travel.

Description 
Nesticodes rufipes is a small red-bodied spider, venomous, but not harmful to humans. They can be extremely common inside homes, building webs in dark corners and under furniture. They have been observed preying on insects such as mosquitoes, flies, and ants.

References

Further reading 
 Lucas, 1846 : Histoire naturelle des animaux articules. Exploration scientifique de l'Algerie pendant les annees 1840, 1841, 1842 publiee par ordre du Gouvernement et avec le concours d'une commission academique. Paris, Sciences physiques, Zoologie, .

External links 
 
 
 
 

Monotypic Araneomorphae genera
Pantropical spiders
Theridiidae